The Bloch spectrum is a concept in quantum mechanics in the field of theoretical physics; this concept addresses certain energy spectrum considerations.  Let H be the one-dimensional Schrödinger equation operator

where Uα is a periodic function of period α. The Bloch spectrum of H is defined as the set of values E for which all the solutions of (H − E)φ = 0 are bounded on the whole real axis. The Bloch spectrum consists of the half-line E0 < E from which certain closed intervals [E2j−1, E2j] (j = 1, 2, ...) are omitted. These are forbidden bands (or gaps) so the (E2j−2, E2j−1) are allowed bands.

References 

Quantum mechanics